The Church of St Maughan in St. Maughans, Monmouthshire, Wales, is a parish church with its origins in the 13th or 14th century. It was reconstructed in the mid 19th century by John Pollard Seddon for John Etherington Welch Rolls of  The Hendre in 1865. It remains an active parish church and is a Grade II* listed building.

History
The church was reconstructed in the late 15th or early 16th century, and extensively rebuilt in 1865–1866. The architect was Seddon, and the patron John Rolls who had acquitted the patronage of the living at Llangattock Vibon Avel.

Architecture and description
The architectural historian John Newman describes St Maughan's as "a complete Perpendicular church, at first sight". On closer inspection, the significant later alterations become obvious. The church is flanked by a farmhouse and barns in the tiny hamlet. Of old red sandstone, it has a combined nave and chancel, with a corresponding aisle and a tower, capped with a two-storeyed timber belfry which is entirely Seddon's work. The interior contains a "remarkable" timber arcade, which dates from the medieval re-modelling. On the south wall is a memorial plaque to General Sir Robert Brownrigg of nearby Hilston Park, a noted general in the Napoleonic Wars.

Notes

References
 

Grade II* listed churches in Monmouthshire
History of Monmouthshire
Church in Wales church buildings
14th-century church buildings in Wales